Mohammed Zanzan Atte-Oudeyi (commonly known simply as Zanzan; born September 2, 1980 in Lomé) is a retired Togolese footballer.

Career

Club
Zanzan began his career playing for JS du Ténéré in the Niger Premier League and for Satellite FC in Côte d'Ivoire, before moving to play in Belgium in 2002.

Zanzan played for six years in the Belgian First Division, for Germinal Beerschot, Lokeren and FC Brussels, and briefly played in the Romanian Liga I for Otopeni, before continuing his career in North America.

On April 15, 2009, Zanzan signed with Montreal Impact of the USL First Division. He played 12 games for the Canadian team before leaving at the end of November 2009. In 2012, he signed a contract at amateur team FC Eksaarde In Belgium. Which is 3rd division.

International
Zanzan has been a regular with the Togolese national team since 1999, having made his debut when he was just 19 years old. He was part of the Togo squad at the 2006 Africa Cup of Nations.

References

External links

cms.proximedia.com 

Profile and stats - Lokeren

1980 births
Living people
Sportspeople from Lomé
Togolese footballers
Togo international footballers
Togolese expatriate footballers
Beerschot A.C. players
K.S.C. Lokeren Oost-Vlaanderen players
R.W.D.M. Brussels F.C. players
CS Otopeni players
Expatriate soccer players in Canada
USL First Division players
Expatriate footballers in Belgium
Belgian Pro League players
Montreal Impact (1992–2011) players
Expatriate footballers in Romania
Association football defenders
Togolese expatriate sportspeople in Romania
2002 African Cup of Nations players
2006 Africa Cup of Nations players
Place of birth missing (living people)
21st-century Togolese people